Vincent Mercer, OP (born 1947 in Co. Kerry) is a Dominican priest and former headmaster at Newbridge College. He is a convicted sex offender, guilty of dozens of counts of sexual abuse of children. He was also imprisoned from 2013 to 2016 for sexually assaulting a child between 1986 and 1994.

2003 case
In March 2003, Mercer pleaded guilty at Naas District Court to four counts of indecent assault on a 13-year-old boy. He was given a sentence of six months imprisonment.

2005 case
He was convicted in March 2005 of 13 sample charges of indecently assaulting eight boys aged 10–13, between 1970 and 1977.  He received a three-year suspended sentence at Naas Circuit Criminal Court.

References

See also
 Catholic sexual abuse scandal in Ireland
Roman Catholic priests accused of sex offenses
Crimen sollicitationis

Living people
1947 births
Catholic Church sexual abuse scandals in Ireland
20th-century Irish Roman Catholic priests
Catholic priests convicted of child sexual abuse
Irish people convicted of child sexual abuse
Irish people convicted of indecent assault
Religious scandals
Violence against men in Europe